Hai is a Chinese surname meaning "ocean." According to a 2013 study, it was the 293rd most common surname, being shared by 197,000 people or 0.015% of the population, with the province with the most people being Ningxia. In some instances, like with the Ming official Hai Rui, the name originated as a Sinicization of the Arabic name "Haydar".

People 
 Hai Rui (海瑞; Hai Jui; 1514 – 1587) Chinese scholar-official and politician during the Ming dynasty
 Hai Xia (born 1972), a news anchor for China Central Television
 Hai Qing (Chinese: 海清; born 1978) is a Chinese film and television actress
 Ocean Hai (Chinese: 海鸣威; born 10 July 1982) Chinese musical artist
 Hai Rui (basketball), (海瑞; born 1985), professional basketball player from China

See also
 Mar (surname)

Chinese-language surnames
Individual Chinese surnames